Damien Robin (born 5 June 1989) is a French professional footballer who plays for Bourges 18.

He made his professional debut for Clermont Foot on 23 October 2009 in a Ligue 2 match against Vannes OC.

1989 births
Living people
Association football defenders
French footballers
Ligue 2 players
Clermont Foot players
Vannes OC players
Bourges 18 players